The Amangel'dy gas field is a natural gas field located in Almaty Province. It was discovered in 2000 and developed by KazMunayGas. The total proven reserves of the Amangel'dy gas field are around 1.78 trillion cubic feet (50×109m³), and production is centered on 66.5 million cubic feet/day (1.9×106m³).

References 

Natural gas fields in Kazakhstan